Grand River is a city in northwest Decatur County, Iowa, United States. The population was 196 at the time of the 2020 census.

History
Grand River got its start in the year 1881, following construction of the Humeston and Shenandoah Railroad through the territory.

Geography
Grand River is located along the Thompson River (a tributary of the Grand River).

Demographics

2010 census
At the 2010 census there were 236 people in 99 households, including 58 families, in the city. The racial makup of the city was 96.6% White, 0.4% Native American, 1.3% from other races, and 1.7% from two or more races. Hispanic or Latino of any race were 3.4%.

Of the 99 households 29.3% had children under the age of 18 living with them, 42.4% were married couples living together, 12.1% had a female householder with no husband present, 4.0% had a male householder with no wife present, and 41.4% were non-families. 35.4% of households were one person and 23.3% were one person aged 65 or older. The average household size was 2.38 and the average family size was 3.14.

The median age was 38 years. 25.8% of residents were under the age of 18; 9% were between the ages of 18 and 24; 20.3% were from 25 to 44; 21.7% were from 45 to 64; and 23.3% were 65 or older. The gender makeup of the city was 48.3% male and 51.7% female.

2000 census
At the 2000 census there were 225 people in 104 households, including 55 families, in the city. The racial makup of the city was 97.78% White, 0.44% Native American, 0.44% from other races, and 1.33% from two or more races. Hispanic or Latino of any race were 0.44%.

Of the 104 households 24.0% had children under the age of 18 living with them, 45.2% were married couples living together, 6.7% had a female householder with no husband present, and 46.2% were non-families. 41.3% of households were one person and 28.8% were one person aged 65 or older. The average household size was 2.16 and the average family size was 3.02.

The age distribution was 24.0% under the age of 18, 5.3% from 18 to 24, 20.9% from 25 to 44, 19.6% from 45 to 64, and 30.2% 65 or older. The median age was 44 years. For every 100 females, there were 73.1 males. For every 100 females age 18 and over, there were 69.3 males.

The median household income was $22,344 and the median family income  was $26,964. Males had a median income of $23,750 versus $19,750 for females. The per capita income for the city was $14,272. About 7.0% of families and 14.9% of the population were below the poverty line, including 6.7% of those under the age of eighteen and 27.0% of those sixty five or over.

Education
The Central Decatur Community School District operates local area public schools.

References

Cities in Iowa
Cities in Decatur County, Iowa